R. Rachapalli is a village in the Rayalseema region of the south-central part of Andhra Pradesh, India. It is a village in Kodur. As of the 2011 Census of India, the village had a population of 250. The nearest railway station to this village in Kodur is Cuddapah which is 1.55 km away.

References

Villages in Kadapa district